Gordon Bertie (born 20 August 1948) is a Canadian retired flyweight freestyle wrestler who won the world cup in 1975, and placed second in 1976. Earlier in 1974 he won a silver medal at the British Commonwealth Games and a bronze at the world championships. Bertie competed at the 1972 and 1976 Summer Olympics and placed sixth in 1972. At the Pan American Games he finished fourth in 1975 and fifth in 1971.

References

External links
 

1948 births
Living people
People from Lanaudière
Sportspeople from Quebec
Olympic wrestlers of Canada
Wrestlers at the 1972 Summer Olympics
Wrestlers at the 1976 Summer Olympics
Canadian male sport wrestlers
Wrestlers at the 1974 British Commonwealth Games
Commonwealth Games medallists in wrestling
Commonwealth Games silver medallists for Canada
Pan American Games competitors for Canada
Anglophone Quebec people
World Wrestling Championships medalists
Wrestlers at the 1971 Pan American Games
Wrestlers at the 1975 Pan American Games
20th-century Canadian people
Medallists at the 1974 British Commonwealth Games